The Yantis Independent School District is a school district based in Yantis, Texas (USA). The district is located in northwestern Wood County with a small portion extending into neighboring Hopkins County.

In 2009, the school district was rated "academically acceptable" by the Texas Education Agency.

Schools
Yantis High School
Yantis Junior High School
Imogene Glenn Elementary School

References

External links
 Yantis ISD

School districts in Wood County, Texas
School districts in Hopkins County, Texas